Convento de Nuestra Señora del Carmen was a monastery in Zaragoza municipality, Aragon, Spain. It was established in 1290 and demolished in 1835.

1835 disestablishments in Spain
Monasteries in Aragon
Religious organizations disestablished in 1835
Religious organizations established in the 1290s